is a professional Japanese baseball player. He plays pitcher for the Yokohama DeNA BayStars.

External links

 NPB.com

1985 births
Living people
People from Hitachi, Ibaraki
Baseball people from Ibaraki Prefecture
Japanese baseball players
Nippon Professional Baseball pitchers
Yokohama BayStars players
Yokohama DeNA BayStars players